Peela Govinda Satyanarayana (Peela Govind) (born 18 August 1965) is an Indian politician from the Telugu Desam Party. He is an ex Member of the Andhra Pradesh Legislative Assembly from Anakapalle constituency.  He was born in Pendurthi and currently lives in Anakapalle.

5.Son shine in politics

References

Telugu Desam Party politicians
Andhra Pradesh MLAs 2014–2019
1965 births
Living people